"Be an Astronaut" is a song by English singer, songwriter, and musician Declan McKenna. It was released on 5 August 2020 as the fourth single from his upcoming second studio album, Zeros. The song was written by Declan McKenna and produced by Jay Joyce.

Background
McKenna announced the release of the new single on his social media on 4 August 2020. The song was released on 5 August 2020, and the song premiered on Beats 1 with Zane Lowe on the same day.

Critical reception
Robin Murray from Clash said, "There's a hint of Bowie here, with Declan pushing his art in a different direction. A lush return from the boy wonder, 'Be An Astronaut' is the sound of this 21 year old setting his sights on the stars."

Music video
A music video to accompany the release of "Be an Astronaut" was first released onto YouTube on 7 August 2020. The video was directed by Huse Monfaradi.

Track listing

Personnel
Credits adapted from Tidal.
 Jay Joyce – producer
 Declan McKenna – composer, lyricist, associated performer, guitar, piano, synthesizer, vocal
 Court Blankenship – assistant engineer
 Jimmy Mansfield – assistant engineer
 Nathan Cox – bass
 Soren Bryce – cello, violin
 Gabrielle King – drums
 Jason Hall – engineer
 Matt Wolach – engineer
 Michael Freeman – engineer
 Isabel Torres – guitar
 Matt Colton – mastering engineer
 Mark 'Spike' Stent – mixing engineer

Charts

Release history

References

2020 songs
2020 singles
Declan McKenna songs
Song recordings produced by Jay Joyce